Pyotr Nikolaevich Fedoseev (Russian: Пётр Николаевич Федосеев; 22 August 1908 – 18 October 1990) was a Soviet philosopher, sociologist, politician and public figure.

Biography 
Fedossev was born in to a peasant family. In 1930 he graduated from the Gorky Pedagogical Institute and in the same year, from among the students of the socio-economic department of the pedagogical faculty, he was approved as a nominee for preparation for teaching philosophy. In 1936 he completed his postgraduate studies at the Moscow Institute of Philosophy, Literature and History, having defended his dissertation for the degree of Candidate of Philosophical Sciences on the topic "Formation of Philosophical Views of F. Engels".

From 1936 to 1941 he was a researcher at the Institute of Philosophy of the Academy of Sciences of the Soviet Union. He received his Doctorate of Philosophical Sciences in 1940 with the dissertation "Marxism-Leninism on religion and its overcoming". From 1941 to 1955 he worked in the apparatus of the Central Committee of the All-Union Communist Party of Bolsheviks and was the editor-in-chief of the magazine Bolshevik (later Kommunist). He was head of the department of dialectical materialism of the Academy of Social Sciences under the Central Committee of the CPSU.

From 1955 to 1962 he was director of the Institute of Philosophy of the Academy of Sciences. From 195to 1967 he was Academician-Secretary of the Department of Philosophy and Law (Department of Economic, Philosophical and Legal Sciences) of the Academy of Sciences of the USSR. In 1962-1967 and in 1971-1988 he was vice-president of the Academy of Sciences. From 1967 to 1973 he was director of the Institute of Marxism–Leninism under the Central Committee of the CPSU.

He was one of the academicians of the Academy of Sciences of the USSR, who in 1973 signed a letter from scientists to the Pravda newspaper condemning "the behavior of Academician Andrey Sakharov".

He was elected a member of the Central Committee of the Party at the of the CPSU. He was a deputy of the Supreme Soviet of the Soviet Union of the 6th and 9 convocations. Fedossev was Chairman of the Commission for Public Education, Science and Culture of the Council of Nationalities of 8-9 convocations. He was chairman of the Board of the Soviet-Hungarian Friendship Society. He was an honorary member of the Hungarian Academy of Sciences, foreign member of the Bulgarian Academy of Sciences, Academy of Sciences of East Germany and the Czechoslovak Academy of Sciences.

After a fire in the Library of the Academy of Sciences on February 15, 1988, he resigned from the post of vice-president of the academy.

Pyotr Nikolaevich Fedoseev died on October 18, 1990, and was buried at the Novodevichy Cemetery.

Scientific activity 
Fedoseev's main works are devoted to the subjects of historical materialism, scientific communism, scientific atheism as well as criticism of bourgeois philosophy and sociology. His works has been translated in many different languages, specifically in the former Eastern Bloc.

Awards 

 Lenin Prize
 Hero of Socialist Labor 
 Four Orders of Lenin
 Order of the October Revolution
 Order of the Patriotic War, 1st class 
 Four Orders of the Red Banner of Labor
 Mongolian Order of Sukhbaatar 
 K. Marx Gold Medal of the Academy of Sciences of the USSR

References 

1908 births
1990 deaths
Soviet philosophers
Soviet sociologists
Soviet politicians
Members of the Russian Academy of Sciences
20th-century Russian philosophers
Russian Marxists
Soviet Marxists
Full Members of the USSR Academy of Sciences
Members of the German Academy of Sciences at Berlin
Soviet editors
Central Committee of the Communist Party of the Soviet Union members
Sixth convocation members of the Supreme Soviet of the Soviet Union
Seventh convocation members of the Supreme Soviet of the Soviet Union
Eighth convocation members of the Soviet of Nationalities
Ninth convocation members of the Soviet of Nationalities
Tenth convocation members of the Supreme Soviet of the Soviet Union
Eleventh convocation members of the Supreme Soviet of the Soviet Union
Heroes of Socialist Labour
Recipients of the Order of the Red Banner of Labour
Recipients of the Order of Lenin
Lenin Prize winners
Burials at Novodevichy Cemetery